Alexandre Bretholz (born 9 June 1944) is a Swiss fencer. He competed in the individual and team épée events at the 1968 Summer Olympics.

References

External links
 

1944 births
Living people
Swiss male fencers
Olympic fencers of Switzerland
Fencers at the 1968 Summer Olympics
People from Broye-Vully District
Sportspeople from the canton of Vaud